The Demas Range is a mountain range about  long that forms the lower east margin of the Berry Glacier in Marie Byrd Land. It was discovered by the United States Antarctic Service, 1939–41, led by Admiral Richard E. Byrd, and was named by the Advisory Committee on Antarctic Names for E.J. "Pete" Demas, a member of the Byrd Antarctic Expeditions of 1928–30 and 1933–35.

Features
Kouperov Peak

References

Mountain ranges of Marie Byrd Land